Salangen may refer to:

Places
Salangen, a municipality in Troms county, Norway
Salangen (fjord), a fjord in Troms county, Norway
Salangen Church, a church in Salangen municipality in Troms county, Norway
Salangen Airport, Elvenes, an airport in Troms county, Norway

Other
Salangen IF, a Norwegian alliance sports club from Sjøvegan in Troms county